Mari-Luci Jaramillo (June 19, 1928 – November 20, 2019) was an American educator and diplomat who served as U.S. Ambassador to Honduras from 1977 to 1980. Upon her confirmation, Jaramillo became the first Mexican-American woman to serve as an American ambassador.

Early life and education 
Jaramillo was native of Las Vegas, New Mexico. While attending school, she worked in her father's shop, shining shoes. Later, she cleaned houses and waited tables in order to help pay for her tuition at New Mexico Highlands University. In 1959, she graduated magna cum laude from Highlands University with a master's degree in education. In 1970, she earned a doctorate from the University of New Mexico. Her doctoral thesis was entitled In-service teacher education in a tri-ethnic community: a participant-observer study.

Career 
After graduation, she became an elementary school teacher. Later Jaramillo joined the faculty at the University of New Mexico and served in various roles, including associate dean, vice president, and assistant to the president of the university.

On April 1, 1977, President Carter asked Jaramillo to become the United States Ambassador to Honduras. She served as ambassador from 1977 to 1980. While serving as ambassador, Jaramillo oversaw the Peace Corps program in Honduras.

Since her ambassadorship, Jaramillo has worked for Educational Testing Service and spent several years at The Pentagon. She has also served on the board of trustees of the Children's Television Workshop and the Diversity External Advisory Council of the Los Alamos National Laboratory. Jaramillo was later a member of the National Association of Latino Elected and Appointed Officials.

In 1992, Jaramillo was appointed deputy Assistant Secretary of Defense for Latin America during the Clinton Administration.

Personal life 
Jaramillo's first marriage to Horacio Ulibarrí ended in divorce after the couple had two sons and a daughter. Her second husband was Heriberto Jaramillo and her third husband was James Elliott.

Jaramillo died in Albuquerque, New Mexico on November 20, 2019. She was 91.

Works

References

 
 

1928 births
2019 deaths
People from Las Vegas, New Mexico
People from New Mexico
New Mexico Highlands University alumni
University of New Mexico alumni
American women academics
University of New Mexico faculty
American women ambassadors
Ambassadors of the United States to Honduras
United States Department of Defense officials
21st-century American women